Red is a color.

Red or RED may also refer to:

Places
 Red Barracks, Weymouth, Dorset, England
 Red Creek (Mississippi), a tributary of the Pascagoula River in the United States
 Red Creek, a tributary of the Dry Fork (Cheat River) in the U.S. state of West Virginia
 Red Lake (disambiguation)
 Red Mountain (disambiguation)
 Red River (disambiguation)
 Red Rock (disambiguation)
 Red Sea, between Africa and the Arabian Peninsula

People
 Red (nickname)
 Red Buttons (1919–2006), stage name of American actor and comedian born Aaron Chwatt
 Amazing Red, ring name of American professional wrestler Jonathan Figueroa (born 1982)
 Red Bastien, ring name of American professional wrestler Rolland Bastien (1931–2012)
 Red Berry (wrestler), ring name American professional wrestler Ralph L. Berry (1906–1973)
 Red Coffey (1923–1988), stage name of American voice actor and comedian born Merle Coffman
 Red Jordan Arobateau (1943–2021), American author, playwright, poet and painter
 Red Shea (guitarist) (1938–2008), Canadian folk guitarist born Laurice Milton Pouliot
 Spanish Red, a female professional wrestler from the Gorgeous Ladies of Wrestling

Arts and entertainment

Comics  

 Red (manga), a 2006 manga by Sanae Rokuya
 Red (WildStorm), a 2003/2004 three-issue comic book mini-series
 Red (1998), a manga by Kenichi Muraeda
 Red (2007), a manga by Naoki Yamamoto

Fictional characters
 Red (Cars), a fire truck in the Pixar film Cars
 Red (Pokémon), the main male playable character of Pokémon Red and Blue, the protagonist of Pokémon Origins, and the main inspiration for the anime character Ash Ketchum
 Red (Pokémon Adventures), a main character in the Pokémon Adventures manga
 Red (Tex Avery), in various animated shorts and Tom and Jerry movies
 Red (Mega Man), in the Mega Man X video game series
 Red XIII, a feline character in the video game Final Fantasy VII
 Red Forman, on the TV series That '70s Show
 Red, in the film Son of Kong
 Red, a male brachiosaurus in the animated series Dink, the Little Dinosaur
 Red, from the children's show Fraggle Rock
 Red, in the animated series Motorcity
 Red, a female student at South Park Elementary in the adult animated series South Park
 Red, a demon in the Warioware series
 Red, a male sparrow in the Hungarian animated film Willy the Sparrow 
 Red, a huge demon-cat posing as an elderly dog in the animated film All Dogs Go to Heaven 2
 Red, the main protagonist in the Angry Birds video game series
 Red, the protagonist of the video game Transistor
 Red, from the web series Dick Figures
 Red Grant, in the James Bond novel From Russia, with Love and its film adaptation
 Red Green, in the TV series Smith & Smith and The Red Green Show
 Red Harlow, the main protagonist of the video game Red Dead Revolver 
 Red Puckett, in the animated film  Hoodwinked! 
 Red Raymond, in the TV series Hellcats
 Red Redding, the narrator in Stephen King's novella Rita Hayworth and Shawshank Redemption and its film adaptation The Shawshank Redemption
 Raymond "Red" Reddington, in the TV series The Blacklist
 Galina "Red" Reznikov, in the TV series Orange Is the New Black
 Soldier Boy "B.C.L. RED", in the TV series The Boys

Films
 Three Colours: Red, a 1994 French-Swiss-Polish film and last of Three Colors trilogy
 Red (film series), an American action-comedy film series based on the comic-book miniseries
 Red (2010 film), a 2010 film, first film in the series
 Red 2 (film), a 2013 sequel to the 2010 film, second film in the series
 Red (2002 film), a 2002 Indian Tamil film starring Ajith Kumar
 Red: The Dark Side, a 2007 Indian Hindi film
 Red (2008 film), a 2008 American thriller film
 Red: Werewolf Hunter, a 2010 horror film based on the tale of "Little Red Riding Hood"
 Red 11, a 2019 science fiction horror film
 Red (2021 film), an Indian Telugu-language action thriller film
 Turning Red, a 2022 American animated fantasy comedy film, originally titled Red

Music

Groups
 Red (band), a Christian rock band
 Red (an orchestra), an American chamber orchestra based in Cleveland, Ohio
 Red (Canadian band), a disbanded folk rock band also known as Uisce Beatha
 Red (Dutch band) (active 2008–2010), formed via Popstars, a Dutch talent show

Albums
 Red (Black Uhuru album), 1989
 Red (Datarock album), 2009
 Red (Dia Frampton album), 2011
 Red (Guillemots album), 2008
 Red (John Stevens album), 2005
 Red (King Crimson album), 1974
 Red (Leslie Cheung album), 1996
 Red (Marilyn Crispell and Stefano Maltese album), 2000
 Red (Nanase Aikawa album), 1996
 Red (Symbion Project album), 1997
 Red (Taylor Swift album), 2012
 Red (Taylor's Version), 2021 re-recording
 Red (T'Pau album), 1998
 Red (The Communards album), 1987
 R.E.D (Tiwa Savage album), 2015
 R.E.D. (Ne-Yo album), 2012
 R.E.D. (Rythmes Extrêmement Dangereux), 2015
 The R.E.D. Album, by Game
 Red (EP), 2011 EP by Weekend
 Red, a 2003 compilation by Kelly Chen
 Red, a 1998 album by NaNa
 Weezer (Red Album), 2008 Weezer album

Songs
 "Red" (A.S. RED song)
 "Red" (B'z song)
 "Red" (Elbow song)
 "Red" (Hyuna song)
 "Red" (Daniel Merriweather song)
 "Red" (Taylor Swift song)
 "Red" (The Gazette song)
 "Red" (Treble Charger song)
 "The Red", by Chevelle from Wonder What's Next
 "Red", a song by 12 Rods from Gay?
 "Red", a song by Belly from King
 "Red", a song by Catfish and the Bottlemen from The Ride "Red", a song by Sammy Hagar from Sammy Hagar "Red", a song by XTC from Go 2TV
 "Red" (2 Stupid Dogs), a 1993 episode of 2 Stupid Dogs "Red" (Dark Angel), an episode of Dark Angel "Red" (Smallville), an episode of Smallville "Red", an episode of Teletubbies
 Red, a former name of defunct Australian TV Channel Channel V Australia

Other
 Red (novel), a 2004 novel by Ted Dekker
 Red (play), a 2009 drama about the painter Mark Rothko by John Logan
 Red (audio drama), a 2006 Doctor Who audio drama
 Pokémon Red, a role-playing video game
 RED, acronym for "Reliable Excavation Demolition", a playable gaming faction in Team Fortress 2 The Red Trilogy, a book series by Linda Nagata

Business and media
 Red Africa, a Nigerian media company
 Red Digital Cinema Camera Company, an American digital cinematography camera manufacturer
 RED Distribution, a record distributor
 Red Entertainment, a video game developer based in Japan
 Red by HBO, a Southeast Asian movie channel
 La Red (Chilean TV channel), a private TV channel
 RED – 1404 AM, a university radio station for the University of Essex
 Xiaohongshu (RED App), a social & e-commerce app in China

Mascots
 Red (mascot), Arkansas State University mascot
 Red, a mascot for M&M's candy

Publications
 Review of Economic Dynamics, a macroeconomics journal
 Red'', a magazine published by Hearst Communications

Politics and public policy 
 Red (political adjective), slang for communism
 Red Party (Norway), a political party founded in 2007
 Red state, a U.S. state with a tendency to elect Republicans
 RED, an abbreviation for the European Union Renewable Energy Directive
 REDII, a revised overall European Union target for renewable energy sources consumption by 2030

Technology 
 Red (cipher machine), a World War II Japanese cipher
 Reduction Equivalent Dose, ability of UV light to kill pathogens in wastewater systems 
 Red (programming language)
 Red (text editor), a 1980s screen editor
 RED, random early detection, a queue management algorithm
 RED, reversed electrodialysis, an energy generation process
 Boris RED, a 3D compositing, titling, and effects application

Transport
 RED, the IATA code for Mifflin County Airport, Pennsylvania, US
 RED, the National Rail code for Redruth railway station, Cornwall, UK
 Red, Virgin America's in-flight environment

Other uses
 Radio Equipment Directive (RED, EU directive 2014/53/EU)
 Product Red, an initiative to raise money for the Global Fund to Fight AIDS, Tuberculosis and Malaria
 Red (Pillow Pal), a Pillow Pal bull made by Ty, Inc
 Redfern-Eveleigh-Darlington, a redevelopment scheme in Sydney, Australia

See also 
 
 
Big Red (gum), a cinnamon-flavored gum made by Wrigley's
Big Red (soft drink), an American variety of cream soda
Red T, a translators and interpreters organization
Read (disambiguation)
Redd (disambiguation)
Red Rooster (disambiguation)
Reds (disambiguation)
Rouge (disambiguation)
The Lady in Red (disambiguation)
The Woman in Red (disambiguation)